Song of Love is a 1947 biopic starring Katharine Hepburn, Paul Henreid, Robert Walker, and Leo G. Carroll, directed by Clarence Brown and released by Metro-Goldwyn-Mayer. The screenplay was co-authored by Ivan Tors, Irma von Cube, Allen Vincent, and Robert Ardrey, based on a play by Bernard Schubert and Mario Silva.

Plot summary

The film is a fictionalized romance set in the 19th century, focussing on musicians Clara Wieck Schumann (Katharine Hepburn), Robert Schumann (Paul Henreid) and Johannes Brahms (Robert Walker).

Clara takes a break from her thriving career as an acclaimed concert pianist to devote herself to her struggling composer husband Robert and their seven children. Johannes Brahms, Schumann's best student, takes a place in their home but falls in love with Clara and eventually realises he must move out.

Schumann works on his opera based on Faust but has no success in having it performed. Unable to cope with disappointment and failure, Robert eventually has a mental breakdown while conducting a performance. He loses his sanity and eventually dies in an asylum. Brahms proposes marriage to Clara but she rejects him saying she will always love Robert. She devotes the rest of her life to preserving his music and his memory.

Cast
 Katharine Hepburn as Clara Wieck Schumann
 Paul Henreid as Robert Schumann
 Robert Walker as Johannes Brahms
 Henry Daniell as Franz Liszt
 Leo G. Carroll as Professor Wieck
 Elsa Janssen as Bertha (as Else Janssen)
 Gigi Perreau as Julie
 'Tinker' Furlong as Felix
 Ann Carter as Marie
 Janine Perreau as Eugenie
 Jimmy Hunt as Ludwig
 Anthony Sydes as Ferdinand
 Eilene Janssen as Elise
 Roman Bohnen as Dr. Hoffman
 Ludwig Stössel as Haslinger (as Ludwig Stossel)

Production notes
Hepburn trained intensively with a pianist for  several weeks prior to production so that she could be filmed playing the piano convincingly. When Henreid is playing piano, the hands of Ervin Nyiregyházi are seen. The soundtrack for the picture was recorded by Arthur Rubinstein. Rubinstein found Hepburn's piano skills  "amazing" and stated that she played almost as well as he.

Reception
The film earned $1,469,000 in the U.S. and Canada and $1,268,000 elsewhere resulting in a loss of $1,091,000.

Variety listed the film as earning $3.1 million in U.S. and Canadian rentals in 1947.

References

External links
 
 Song of Love at IMDB
 Song of Love at TCM Movie Database
 

1947 films
1940s biographical drama films
1940s historical drama films
Metro-Goldwyn-Mayer films
American black-and-white films
Films directed by Clarence Brown
Films with screenplays by Robert Ardrey
Films about classical music and musicians
Films about composers
Films about pianos and pianists
Films set in Germany
American biographical drama films
American historical drama films
Films set in the 1830s
Films set in the 1840s
Films set in the 1850s
Films set in Düsseldorf
Biographical films about musicians
Robert Schumann
Johannes Brahms
Cultural depictions of Franz Liszt
Cultural depictions of classical musicians
1940s English-language films
1940s American films